Szávay is a Hungarian surname. Notable people with the surname include:

 Ágnes Szávay (born 1988), Hungarian tennis player
 Blanka Szávay (born 1993), Hungarian tennis player, sister of Ágnes

Hungarian-language surnames